Mitchell Dodds (born 3 July 1989) is an Australian former professional rugby league footballer who played as a  for the Brisbane Broncos in the NRL and the Warrington Wolves in the Super League.

Background
Dodds completed his schooling at well known rugby union school Iona College, where he played 1st 15 rugby union for Iona in the AIC competition with future rugby league footballer; Jared Waerea-Hargreaves.

Playing career
Dodds played his junior rugby league at Capalaba Warriors, feeder club to Wynnum-Manly Seagulls, playing division 2 football. During his high school years he attended Iona College and played in the first Rugby.

2008
In 2008, Dodds joined the Brisbane Broncos Under 20s side and played in the 2008 Grand Final team which lost to the Canberra Raiders.

2009
Dodds yet again played Under 20s for the Broncos but as well played for Wynnum Manly Seagulls in the Queensland Cup.

2010
Dodds played 23 games during the season and didn't score a try.

2011
He played for the Wynnum Manly Seagulls in the 2011 Queensland Cup when he wasn't playing First Grade. Dodds played 13 games for Brisbane during the season and didn't score a try.

2012
Dodds played 10 First Grade games for the Brisbane Broncos in 2012 and didn't score any tries, but his first game didn't come until round 13 against Newcastle. Dodds yet again played for Wynnum Manly when he didn't play first grade.

2013
Dodds started the season in first grade but then was demoted in round 4 and didn't return until round 12.  Dodds played 11 games for the Brisbane Broncos and he scored his first NRL try against the Canberra Raiders in round 13, but in round 21 against the Newcastle Knights Dodds suffered an anterior cruciate ligament (ACL) knee injury which ended his season.

2014
Dodds didn't play any first grade in 2014 due to an ACL knee injury suffered the previous season in a game against Newcastle.

2015
Dodds played in the Broncos World Club challenge game against Wigan Warriors and then made his return to the NRL in Brisbane's round 1 clash against South Sydney but injured his calf and missed the next three weeks. 

Dodds returned to the Brisbane lineup in round 5 and scored two tries against the Gold Coast Titans. In round 8 there were fears Dodds had done his ACL for the third time in less than two years but luckily it was medial ligament damage. 

Dodds returned in round 15 for Brisbane in the win over the Melbourne Storm due to teammate Josh McGuire suffering a season ending Achilles tendon injury the following week against the Newcastle Knights.

In September, it was confirmed that Dodds signed a one-year deal with English Super League franchise, Warrington Wolves. He played for them in the 2016 season. He moved to Warrington with girlfriend Kelsie Mitchell.

2016
On Saturday 12 Mar 2016, Dodds suffered a double leg break in his tibia and fibula playing against the Catalans Dragons. The Brisbane Broncos announced in October 2016 that he has re-signed for them for the 2017 NRL season to help cover the loss of Corey Parker and Jarrod Wallace.

References

External links
Profile at warringtonwolves.com
Brisbane Broncos profile

1989 births
Living people
Australian rugby league players
Australian expatriate sportspeople in England
Brisbane Broncos players
Rugby league players from Brisbane
Rugby league props
Warrington Wolves players
Wynnum Manly Seagulls players